The Sage Hen Hills are a mountain range in Harney and Lake Counties, Oregon and Humboldt County, Nevada.

References 

Mountain ranges of Oregon
Mountain ranges of Nevada
Mountain ranges of the Great Basin
Mountain ranges of Humboldt County, Nevada
Mountain ranges of Lake County, Oregon
Mountain ranges of Harney County, Oregon